Fégui is a town and urban commune in the Cercle of Kayes in the Kayes Region of south-western Mali. The town lies on the bank of the Falémé River that marks the boundary between Mali and Senegal. In 2009 the commune had a population of 5,494.

References

External links
.

Communes of Kayes Region